Körüklükaya is a village in the central district of Şırnak Province in Turkey. The village had a population of 28 in 2021.

References 

Kurdish settlements in Şırnak Province
Villages in Şırnak District